Charles Augustus Barnitz (September 11, 1780 – January 8, 1850) was an American politician who served as an Anti-Masonic member of the U.S. House of Representatives for Pennsylvania's 11th congressional district from 1833 to 1835.

Early life and education
Barnitz was born in York, Pennsylvania to Jacob (of German descent) and Mary McClean Barnitz.  He received his education at the York Academy.  He studied law, was admitted to the bar in 1811 and commenced practice in York.

Career
He was a member of the Pennsylvania State Senate for the 11th district from 1815 to 1819.

From 1820 until his death he served as agent of the heirs of William Penn for their interests in Springettsbury Manor, the center of which is now the city of York.

Barnitz was elected as an Anti-Masonic candidate to the Twenty-third Congress.  He was not a candidate for reelection in 1834 to the Twenty-fourth Congress.  He resumed the practice of law at York and was also engaged in banking and served as president of the York Bank.  He was member of the State constitutional convention in 1838 and a delegate to the Whig National Conventions at Harrisburg, Pennsylvania, in 1840 and at Baltimore, Maryland, in 1844.  He died in York in 1850.  Interment in the First Presbyterian Churchyard.

Notes

Sources

The Political Graveyard
Lawyers and Leaders: The Role of Lawyers in the Development of York County, Pennsylvania, 2005, York County Bar Association by Georg R. Sheets

|-

1780 births
1850 deaths
American people of German descent
19th-century American politicians
Anti-Masonic Party members of the United States House of Representatives from Pennsylvania
Burials in Pennsylvania
Presbyterians from Pennsylvania
Pennsylvania lawyers
Pennsylvania state senators
Pennsylvania Whigs
Politicians from York, Pennsylvania
19th-century American lawyers